Brian Edward Levy is an American producer and talent manager. Levy is a literary manager at talent management firm Management 360 and an executive at Entertainment 360.

Levy produces feature films, television series and documentaries. He executive produced Lost Transmissions starring Juno Temple and Simon Pegg, Fear and Loathing in Aspen, 30 Minutes or Less starring Jesse Eisenberg and Danny McBride, and documentaries Rudeboy: The Story of Trojan Records and Meet Me in the Bathroom.

Career
Previously, Levy ran the management division of Pulse Films, a subsidiary of Vice Media. In 2020, Levy became a literary manager at Management 360 and an executive at Entertainment 360.

Film Production 
Currently Levy alongside to Jamie Neely, Thomas Benski, and Sam Bridger are in production on a documentary film called Meet Me in the Bathroom, an adaptation of Lizzy Goodman's novel Meet me in the Bathroom. Will Lovelace, Dylan Southern are directing the film.

References

External links

Living people
American television producers
Talent managers
American film producers
1978 births